ScubaVenture: The Search for Pirate's Treasure is a 1993 action video game. The game was developed by Apogee on contract for Softdisk in 1991, and was marketed as a Softdisk game; Apogee developed the title on behalf of id Software (being the final game they owed Softdisk), in order to let them focus on developing Wolfenstein 3D (1992).

Plot
The player character dives in the Caribbean sea to search the sunken wreck of the Barbarosa to search for treasure and uncover the mystery being disappearing explorers.

Gameplay
The player swims around a number of shipwreck levels with a speargun with limited harpoons for attacking enemies. The player also has a limited oxygen supply and vitality. Vitality is replenished with collectible hearts and oxygen is refilled by picking up tanks.

References

External links

1993 video games
Apogee games
DOS games
DOS-only games
Scuba diving video games
Side-scrolling platform games
Video games developed in the United States
Video games set in the Caribbean
Softdisk